Giovanni Girolamo Saccheri (5 September 1667 – 25 October 1733) was an Italian Jesuit priest, scholastic philosopher, and mathematician.

Saccheri was born in Sanremo. He entered the Jesuit order in 1685 and was ordained as a priest in 1694. He taught philosophy at the University of Turin from 1694 to 1697 and philosophy, theology and mathematics at the University of Pavia from 1697 until his death. He was a protégé of the mathematician Tommaso Ceva and published several works including Quaesita geometrica (1693), Logica demonstrativa (1697), and Neo-statica (1708).

Geometrical work
He is primarily known today for his last publication, in 1733 shortly before his death. Now considered an early exploration of non-Euclidean geometry, Euclides ab omni naevo vindicatus (Euclid Freed of Every Flaw) languished in obscurity until it was rediscovered by Eugenio Beltrami, in the mid-19th century.

The intent of Saccheri's work was ostensibly to establish the validity of Euclid by means of a reductio ad absurdum proof of any alternative to Euclid's parallel postulate.  To do so, he assumed that the parallel postulate was false and attempted to derive a contradiction.

Since Euclid's postulate is equivalent to the statement that the sum of the internal angles of a triangle is 180°, he considered both the hypothesis that the angles add up to more or less than 180°.

The first led to the conclusion that straight lines are finite, contradicting Euclid's second postulate. So Saccheri correctly rejected it. However, the principle is now accepted as the basis of elliptic geometry, where both the second and fifth postulates are rejected.

The second possibility turned out to be harder to refute. In fact he was unable to derive a logical contradiction and instead derived many non-intuitive results; for example that triangles have a maximum finite area and that there is an absolute unit of length. He finally concluded that: "the hypothesis of the acute angle is absolutely false; because it is repugnant to the nature of straight lines". Today, his results are theorems of hyperbolic geometry.

There is some minor argument on whether Saccheri really meant that, as he published his work in the final year of his life, came extremely close to discovering non-Euclidean geometry and was a logician. Some believe Saccheri concluded as he did only to avoid the criticism that might come from seemingly-illogical aspects of hyperbolic geometry.

One tool that Saccheri developed in his work (now called a Saccheri quadrilateral) has a precedent in the 11th-century Persian polymath Omar Khayyám's Discussion of Difficulties in Euclid (Risâla fî sharh mâ ashkala min musâdarât Kitâb 'Uglîdis). Khayyam, however, made no significant use of the quadrilateral, whereas Saccheri explored its consequences deeply.

See also
Saccheri–Legendre theorem
Hyperbolic geometry
Parallel postulate
List of Jesuit scientists
List of Roman Catholic cleric–scientists

References
 Martin Gardner, Non-Euclidean Geometry, Chapter 14 of The Colossal Book of Mathematics, W. W.Norton & Company, 2001, 
 M. J. Greenberg, Euclidean and Non-Euclidean Geometries: Development and History, 1st ed. 1974, 2nd ed. 1980, 3rd ed. 1993, 4th edition, W. H. Freeman, 2008.
 Girolamo Saccheri, Euclides Vindicatus (1733), edited and translated by G. B. Halsted, 1st ed. (1920); 2nd ed. (1986), review by John Corcoran: Mathematical Reviews 88j:01013, 1988.

Works

External links
 
 

1667 births
1733 deaths
People from Sanremo
17th-century Italian mathematicians
18th-century Italian mathematicians
Geometers
17th-century Italian Jesuits
18th-century Italian Jesuits
Italian philosophers
Jesuit scientists